Stanley C. Shakespeare (February 5, 1963 – April 26, 2005) was an American football wide receiver who played one season with the Tampa Bay Buccaneers of the National Football League. He played college football at the University of Miami and attended Lake Worth High School in Lake Worth Beach, Florida. He was a member of the Buccaneers during the  1987 NFLPA strike. He drowned on April 26, 2005 after being knocked off his boat by a large wave.

References

External links
Just Sports Stats
College stats

1963 births
2005 deaths
Players of American football from New York (state)
American football wide receivers
African-American players of American football
Miami Hurricanes football players
Tampa Bay Buccaneers players
Sportspeople from Auburn, New York
People from Palm Beach Gardens, Florida
Players of American football from Florida
Accidental deaths in Florida
Deaths by drowning in the United States
20th-century African-American sportspeople
21st-century African-American people